Cooperative video game, often abbreviated as co-op, is a video game that allows players to work together as teammates, usually against one or more non-player character opponents (PvE).

It is distinct from other multiplayer modes, such as competitive multiplayer modes like player versus player (PvP) or deathmatch. Playing simultaneously allows players to assist one another in many ways: passing weapons or items, healing, providing covering fire in a firefight, and performing cooperative maneuvers such as boosting a teammate up and over obstacles.

In its most simple form, cooperative gameplay modifies the single player mode of a game, sometimes with broader modifications to the story and gameplay. Examples include beat 'em up games such as Double Dragon, Streets of Rage, and Die Hard Arcade. Other co-op games are designed for cooperative gameplay, with each player taking a special role in gameplay, or alternatively take advantage of having multiple players in an impactful way on gameplay. Example for such games include the Left 4 Dead and the Payday series. 

Co-op games can be played over a network via a local area networks or wide area networks, such as in the Destiny and Borderlands series, while other co-op games can be played locally using one or multiple input controllers, with It Takes Two as an example. Some games such as Mario Kart Wii and Call of Duty'''s co-op modes allow two players from the same console to play with others online.

Co-op gameplay has been gaining popularity in video games in recent years, as controller and networking technology has developed. On PCs and consoles, cooperative games have become increasingly common, and many genres of game—including shooter games, sports games, real-time strategy games, and massively multiplayer online games—include co-op modes.

History
Arcade co-op gaming

The first video game to feature co-op play dates back to 1973, with Atari's arcade video game Pong Doubles, which was a tennis doubles version of their hit arcade game Pong (1972). Co-op play was later featured in another Atari coin-op, Fire Truck (1978). As its title suggests, the game involves a large fire truck, and in two-player mode both players are required to cooperatively steer the vehicle along a winding road, with one driving and steering the tractor of the truck and the other steering the tiller for the rear wheels, controlling the swing of the trailer.

Several early 1980s arcade coin-op games allowed for co-op play, but typically as an option. Wizard of Wor offered solo, competitive two-player, or cooperative two-player gaming. while Williams Electronics' Joust encouraged players to alternatively compete and cooperate by awarding bonus points for co-op play in some rounds (Survival Waves) while alternatively awarding bonuses for attacking the other player (Gladiator Waves). Two-player games of Nintendo's Mario Bros. could be played as competitively or cooperatively depending on the players' whims.

The run-and-gun shooter genre was popular for co-op games. Gauntlet (1985) and Quartet (1986) popularized co-op four-player gaming in the arcades. The games had broader consoles to allow for four sets of controls.

Beat 'em up games like Double Dragon in 1987 and Final Fight in 1989 introduced a type of game where both players would work in tandem to clear out all of the enemies and proceed to the next area and ultimately the final boss. In 1998 Time Crisis 2 launched as the first in the series as a two-player arcade rail shooter where two players would go through levels with slight differences allowing each player to cover each other and utilize the environment to create cover. In 2009 Konami and Activision put out Guitar Hero Arcade, a co-op rhythm game which allowed players to work together to complete a song of their choosing or the two players could fight each other in the battle mode with each guitarist striving for a higher score.

Console co-op gaming

Early-generation home consoles typically did not offer co-op options, due to technical limitations which hindered the increased graphics required for simultaneous co-op play. Though consoles from the second generation of video games onward typically had controller ports for two-player games, most systems did not have the computing or graphical power for simultaneous play, leading most games that billed "2-player gameplay" as a feature to merely be the single player game with alternating players.

During this early era, many video games which featured co-op play (including beat 'em ups such as Double Dragon) were ported to less advanced home systems. Alternating play replaced the arcade's co-op play in the NES version (although Double Dragon II and III, for the same system, did retain their co-op gameplay). Most other titles featuring two-player were head-to-head sports titles. Though most of the console beat 'em ups were arcade ports, original franchises such as Streets of Rage and River City Ransom also became popular.

In the run-and-gun shooter genre, Contra was more successful in its NES incarnation than it was in the arcades in the North American market, and is now considered one of the most popular co-op games ever. Gunstar Heroes for the Sega Genesis and the Metal Slug series for the Neo Geo were also well-received titles.

Electronic Arts has produced key co-op sports games, including the original NHL Hockey (1991) and Madden NFL (1990) installments on the Sega Genesis. These games allowed two players or more to play against the CPU. These franchises are arguably the most successful co-op sports games.

Due to the lack of online multiplayer, co-op games in the RPG genre have generally been less common on console systems than on PCs. Nevertheless, some of the earliest co-op action RPGs were console titles, including the TurboGrafx-16 game Dungeon Explorer (1989) by Atlus which allowed up to five players to play simultaneously, and Square's Secret of Mana (1993) for the Super NES which offered two- and three-player action once the main character had acquired his party members. Secret of Mana's co-op gameplay was considered innovative in its time, as it allowed the second or third players to drop in and out of the game at any time rather than players having to join the game at the same time, which has remained influential on titles as recent as the upcoming Dungeon Siege III. Final Fantasy VI (1994) offered a form of alternating co-op play for its battles, with the second player taking control of half of the characters in the party. Namco's Tales series allowed multiple players to take control of individual members in its real-time battles in some of the titles, such as Tales of Symphonia, while the Baldur's Gate: Dark Alliance games replicated the Diablo formula for consoles, offering two-player simultaneous play through the game's campaign.

With the release of the Nintendo 64 (1996, 1997), having four controller ports started to become a standard feature in consoles, as the Dreamcast, Nintendo GameCube and Xbox all later featured them. As larger multiplayer games became feasible, cooperative gameplay also became more available. The 7th and current generations of video game consoles all feature wireless controllers, removing port-based local player limits. However, its effect on multiplayer is probably less pronounced than the advancement of console internet capabilities.

PC co-op gaming

First-person shooters

The release of Doom in 1993 was a breakthrough in network gaming. Though arguably deathmatch was both the most influential and most popular mode, Doom's co-op gameplay was also significant. Up to four players could travel through the entire game together, playing on separate computers over a LAN. The game's campaign mode was designed primarily for single player, but the difficulty was tweaked to compensate for extra human players. The following three games produced by id Software (Doom II, Quake and Quake II) all featured co-op modes. Some of these first-person shooters employ cooperative gameplay, where many players are joined to reach a common goal. However, some first person shooters do not make use of cooperative gameplay.

Starting from the early 2000s, however, many FPS developers have forsaken co-op campaign play, opting to focus more purely on either a more detailed and in-depth single player experience or a purely multiplayer game. Epic's Unreal Tournament series had shifted almost entirely towards deathmatch modes, and significant FPS releases such as Doom 3, Quake 4, and both Half-Life titles shipped without cooperative gameplay modes. However, with the Gears of War franchise introducing the "Horde" four-player cooperative mode, it has undergone a resurgence, starting a trend which included Halo 3: ODSTs "Firefight" mode and Call of Duty: World at Wars "Nazi Zombies" mode. More games in the genre from the 2010s include the Payday and Destiny series.

Role-playing games

Most early role-playing video games were inspired by Dungeons & Dragons, but were restricted to single player due to the technology of the era. The earliest RPGs featuring something resembling co-op play were MUDs, which would later evolve into the MMOG genre.

In 1989, Image Works released Bloodwych for MS-DOS and various other platforms which featured a two-player cooperative mode via split screen where 2 players needed to cooperate in order to solve puzzles and eliminate enemies.

Later PC RPGs became more powerful and flexible in simulating the shared real life RPG experience, allowing players to collaborate in games over the Internet. Blizzard Entertainment's immensely successful Diablo (1996), which incorporated Blizzard's online matchmaking service, battle.net, allowing the game's players to play through the entire single player campaign together. The D&D-sanctioned Baldur's Gate and Icewind Dale games, released in 1998 and 2000, respectively, allowed up to six players to play through the campaign mode over a network.  Atari's Neverwinter Nights (2002) was an official and comprehensive D&D simulator, featuring even more robust game-creation tools and developing a sizable online community. It allowed one player to serve as a Dungeon Master, shaping and altering the game world against a party of human-controlled players, playing cooperatively. (An earlier game, Vampire: The Masquerade – Redemption (2000) was the earliest CRPG to feature this sort of "storyteller" mode.)

Contemporary MMORPGs such as Blizzard Entertainment's World of Warcraft feature a mixture of single-player goals ("quests") and larger end-game challenges that can only be completed via intensive co-op play, of up to twenty-five (formerly forty) players in end-game raids, and up to forty versus forty in battlegrounds.

Gameplay characteristics

Couch co-op and online co-op modes

Cooperative games designed to be played by multiple players on the same display screen have come to be known as "couch co-op", "local co-op" or "single-player co-op" games. Cooperative games in which players each use their own display system are known as "online co-op", "network co-op" or "multiplayer co-op" games due to the majority of such systems utilizing telecommunications networks to synchronize game state among the players. Games have also been brought to market in which both modes can be combined—accommodating more than one display with each display accommodating one or more players.

While there are no practical technical limits to how many players can be involved in a cooperative game, the industry has settled on games that support up to four players as a informal standard. This comes from a combination of factors. Historically, cooperative arcade video games maxed out at four players. Similarly, consoles which supported local co-op play on the same screen also maxed out at four players. There is also a human factor according to various developers. While having more than four players involved could make a game more interesting to play, this starts to exceed a comfortable number related to social interactions between players and may cause segmenting of the larger group into smaller ones, while up to four players encourages cooperation and coordination within that group.

Display features

Many video games support split screen displays in order to show two or more players in different regions of the game. Split screen displays would usually split the main screen into either two or four sub-regions so that 2–4 players can roam freely within the game world. Many first-person and third-person shooter games use this technique when played in multiplayer co-op mode, such as the console versions of games in the Rainbow Six series, the Halo series or the fifth installment of the Call of Duty series, Call of Duty: World at War.

Split screen modes have also been combined with 3D Television technology by hobbyists, using alternate-frame sequencing for the purpose of presenting each of two couch co-op players with their own 2D full-screen image on the same display, rather than for stereoscopy. Due to the complexity involved in correcting the resulting aspect ratios, and that in obtaining 3D glasses which allowed both lenses to synchronize to the same eye-frame, this remained the purview of enthusiasts until 2011, when
Sony Computer Entertainment America began to market a 3D display product for their consoles. This display system supported this practice under the trademark SimulView. While the SimulView feature set was designed to work only with the Sony 3D monitor, the move renewed interest in this technology, and it was not long before the gaming community circumvented this vendor lock-in gambit, allowing SimulView-supporting games to utilize the feature on third-party 3DTV equipment.

By contrast, in cooperative platform games, both players typically occupy the same screen and must coordinate their actions, particularly with regard to the scrolling. If the scrolling is limited to a forward direction only, players can potentially kill each other. For example, one player lagging behind could cause problems for his partner, as the screen will not scroll onward. If a player was attempting to complete a jump over a chasm, the "safe" surface on the far side of the chasm could be prevented from scrolling into view by a slow player.

Developers have attempted to counter these frustrations by using a camera that can zoom in and out over an entire level as needed, keeping both players within the scope of the camera. This type of camera was used to enable the display of four player cooperative gameplay in New Super Mario Bros. Wii. Another strategy allows player screens to be split when the player characters are far apart, but combine into one full-screen image when player characters are close enough together. The 2005 video game The Warriors is considered notable for attempting this in a 3D third-person perspective format.

Resource management

A common concept in cooperative games is the sharing of resources between players. For example, two players managing one team in a real-time strategy game, such as StarCraft, will often have to draw off the same pool of resources to build and upgrade their units and buildings. The sharing of resources, however, can be as simple as the system used in the Contra games (and other shoot-'em-up/beat-'em-up games) where a player who is out of spare lives could "steal" a life from the other player so both players could continue to play at the same time.

Role of the second player
The role that the second player takes upon joining a game differs from game to game. Most co-op games have the second player directly take control of another character that is usually subject to the same rules as the first player (i.e., a separate health bar). Some games, like Super Mario Galaxy, the Wii version of Prince of Persia: The Forgotten Sands, Super Mario Odyssey and some versions of Transformers: Revenge of the Fallen'', however, limit the second player to an omniscient, invulnerable (and sometimes disembodied) helper role, who then moves along with and assists the first player with abilities that he/she usually lacks. This may include the ability to attack enemies within the first player's view, typically via a targeting reticle. Other co-op games such as It Takes Two and Evolve give the other player special roles,  tasks or abilities.

Video games with co-op mode

Asynchronous co-op mode
Asynchronous co-op games are becoming prevalent among mobile platforms like smartphones and tablets due to their low-bandwidth requirement. Examples include Glu Mobile's Gun Bros and Gamevil's Zenonia 3. Asynchronous cooperative games upload only the character details to the server. During co-op gameplay, the server sends another player's character details, which are then controlled by the local AI.

See also
 Player versus environment

References

Video game gameplay
 
Video game terminology